Dioryctria zimmermani, the Zimmerman pine moth, is a moth of the  family Pyralidae. It is found from southern Canada and the north-eastern and Great Lakes areas of the United States. There is a disjunct population in eastern Nebraska.

The wingspan is about 37 mm. The forewings are mottled gray and red/brown with zigzag light and dark markings. The hindwings are yellowish white. There is one generation per year.

The larvae feed on various Pinus species, but prefer Austrian and Scotch pine. Young larvae move to protected sites under bark scales or in crevices below a main lateral branch. Here, they spin a silken chamber. In mid April, after overwintering, the larvae feed on the bark of their host plant. They mine the inner bark on the main stem and may also feed inside the terminal shoots. It is considered a serious pest of pine species in the mid-west of the United States. Full-grown larvae are 18–25 mm long. They are dirty white to pink or green in colour.

Gallery

References

Moths described in 1877
zimmermani